Saint Amasius of Teano (d. 356) was the second bishop of Teano in Italy.

According to his Vita, Amasius was a Greek who was forced into exile, fleeing the persecution of the Arian Emperor Constantius. Pope Julius I invited him to preach in Campania. In Sora he healed a boy with gout and performed other miracles, but was later expelled by the Arian faction.  

In 346 Julius appointed him bishop of Teano in the Province of Caserta in succession to Saint Paris, and consecrated him bishop in the Basilica of Santi Apostoli, Rome. The Sorani, to repair the offense done to him, erected a church in his honor.

Amasius died around 356; his feast day is 23 January. 

"In Teano in Campania, commemoration of Saint Amasius, bishop, around 356." (Roman martyrology) His cult is still alive in several dioceses in central Italy.

References

4th-century Christian saints
Year of birth unknown
356 deaths
Bishops in Campania
People from the Province of Caserta